The 2002 Tour de Romandie was the 56th edition of the Tour de Romandie cycle race and was held from 30 April to 5 May 2002. The race started in Geneva and finished in Lausanne. The race was won by Dario Frigo of the Tacconi Sport team.

General classification

References

2002
Tour de Romandie